These are the events concerning the 2011 Singaporean general election which occurred before the polling day on 7 May 2011.

Nomination

New candidates
A total of 78 candidates were brand-new to this election, among which 54 were from six participating opposition parties and 24 were from the ruling People's Action Party.

Outgoing politicians
The list of outgoing politicians who were either deceased, retiring or stepping down from their seats were from the PAP.

Staking claims
Soon after the announcement of the new electoral boundaries, various opposition parties indicated their intent to contest, subject to negotiations between political parties to avoid three-cornered fights. The parties declaring an interest to contest each constituency and their nomination status is reflected below.

Group Representation Constituencies

Single Member Constituencies

References

2011 Singaporean general election
2011